The 2007 IRL IndyCar Series began with a night race on Saturday March 24 at Homestead-Miami Speedway. The season's premiere event, the 91st Indianapolis 500 was held May 27. The season finale was held at Chicagoland Speedway on September 9. Dario Franchitti, who won four races during the season, including the Indy 500, clinched the 2007 IndyCar Series championship after he won the final race of the season at Chicagoland Speedway, after points leader Scott Dixon ran out of fuel in turn 3 of the final lap.

At the conclusion of the season, Danica Patrick was voted Most Popular Driver for the third consecutive year.

All races were televised on the ESPN family of networks. In addition, all races were broadcast live on the IMS Radio Network, and XM IndyCar Channel 145 and simulcast on XM Sports Nation.

The 2007 schedule was the twelfth season of the IRL IndyCar Series, and part of the 96th recognized season of top-level American open wheel racing. It was the final season that IndyCar Series ran independently before the IRL merged with Champ Car in 2008. It also marked A. J. Foyt's 50th anniversary of participation in IndyCar racing.

It was also the final season that all IndyCar Series cars ran with the sequential manual gearbox shifters before all IndyCar Series cars switched to sequential semi-automatic paddle-shifters for the following season.

2007 was also the first season that all IndyCar Series entrants utilizing Dallara chassis all-season long although Panoz chassis still only used by part-time drivers for Indianapolis 500 event but without factory support from Panoz.

Confirmed entries
All entries utilize Honda engines and Firestone Firehawk tires.

Driver changes
Danica Patrick switched from Rahal Letterman Racing to Andretti Green Racing.
Buddy Rice left Rahal Letterman Racing and raced a one-off event in the Champ Car series at Mexico City on November 12, 2006, for Forsythe Racing. Afterwards, he signed full-time for Dreyer & Reinbold Racing
Kosuke Matsuura switched from Super Aguri Fernández Racing to Panther Racing.
Scott Sharp switched from Delphi Fernandez Racing to Rahal Letterman Racing.
A. J. Foyt Racing signed Darren Manning for a one car operation.
Dario Franchitti was confirmed for Andretti Green Racing in both the IndyCar Series and ALMS.
Vision Racing signed A. J. Foyt IV as their third driver.
Sarah Fisher rejoined Dreyer & Reinbold Racing for a full-time ride.
Michael Andretti announced he would compete in the 2007 Indy 500 for Andretti Green Racing.
CURB/Agajanian/Beck Motorsports raced in the season opener at Homestead, Kansas, and the Indy 500 with driver Alex Barron.
Milka Duno signed to compete in ten races, including Indianapolis, for SAMAX Motorsport in 2007.
On August 6, 2007, Duno was put on probation by chief steward Brian Barnhart. She will be required to improve her skills before racing in another event.
On July 19, 2007, it was announced that Ryan Hunter-Reay would replace sacked Jeff Simmons for Rahal Letterman Racing.
On July 21, 2007, it was announced that Hideki Mutoh will run the final race of the IndyCar Series season at Chicago in a third Panther entry.
On August 21, 2007, it was announced that both P. J. Chesson and Marty Roth will run the final race of the IndyCar Series season at Chicagoland.

Schedule

 Oval/Speedway
 Road course
 Temporary street circuit
BOLD indicates Superspeedways.

Schedule announcements
The full schedule was ratified on October 13, 2006. Instead of a single schedule announcement, the venues for the 2007 season were announced separately between August and October 2006. Before that, the only race beyond the Indianapolis 500 that had been confirmed was the Grand Prix of St. Petersburg on April 1, 2006.
August 2, 2006 – The first event at Iowa Speedway (June 24).
August 10, 2006 – Milwaukee (June 3). The race moved from July to the weekend following the Indy 500.
August 17, 2006 – Texas (June 9) and Kentucky (August 11). Kentucky switched to a night race. On December 8, 2006, the IRL announced that the Texas race would be lengthened to 550 kilometers (228 laps/342 miles).
September 12, 2006 – Nashville (July 14).
September 19, 2006 – Kansas (April 29) and Watkins Glen (July 8). Kansas became the final race before the Indy 500. The change was made to avoid hot and humid July temperatures.
September 20, 2006 – Richmond (June 30).
September 21, 2006 – Chicagoland Speedway (September 9). It would serve as the season finale.
September 25, 2006 – Twin Ring Motegi (April 21)
September 27, 2006 – Homestead (March 24). The race switched to a Saturday night race.
September 29, 2006 – The Detroit Grand Prix at Belle Isle returned (September 2).
October 12, 2006 – Mid-Ohio (July 22) and Sonoma (August 26)
October 13, 2006 – Michigan (August 5). The race was to be moved forward from the last weekend in July, which was the new date for NASCAR's Allstate 400 at the Brickyard. After a first tentative date of July 22, the IRL and Michigan scheduled the event in August to accommodate new venues. The announcement finalized the 2007 IndyCar schedule.
On December 14, 2006, it was announced that Marquis Sports Marketing, a Dallas-based company, was in coordination to add another race to the 2007 schedule. A non-points, exhibition race in the streets of Biloxi, Mississippi was in the planning stages for September or October 2007 as an effort to revitalize the hurricane-ravaged Gulf Coast. The race would be the first step in what were plans to build an oval track in the area by 2009. However, none of these efforts eventually came to fruition.

Rule changes for 2007
All cars will utilize a 100% fuel blend of ethanol. In the 2006 season, cars utilized a 90%–10% blend of methanol and ethanol. From 1965 to 2005, Indy cars in USAC, CART, and IRL used a 100% methanol blend.
All cars will re-utilize 3.5-liter displacement engines. From 2004 to 2006, the IndyCar Series used 3.0-liter engines. From 2000 to 2003, the IndyCar Series also used 3.5-liter engines and from 1997 to 1999, the Indy Racing League was also used 4.0-liter engines. The increase in displacement is to counter the expected horsepower loss resulting from the switch to a 100% ethanol fuel blend.
Fuel cells in the cars will be reduced from 30 gallons to 22 gallons to offset the improved mileage experienced by ethanol.
All cars will carry a rear-mounted safety light (similar use in Formula One and other single-seater formula racing championships), to be controlled by race officials.
On short ovals and road courses, front wings may be set at any angle between negative 5 and positive 5 degrees.
Race day morning warm-up practice sessions have been eliminated. As a result, pre-qualifying practice sessions will be extended by 15 minutes.
If qualifications are canceled for an event, the starting lineup will be based on entrant points. In previous seasons, top practice speeds have been used.
Series officials will have the discretion to determine the rookie status of any driver, regardless of the number of races started in previous seasons.
IndyCar Series teams that participate in the Indy Pro Series can earn bonus testing days for the 2007 calendar year. The bonus testing days will be awarded following participation in designated 2007 IPS events, and are shared by the team's IndyCar Series driver and IPS driver. They can be conducted at any IndyCar Series venue except Indianapolis or Mid-Ohio.

Television
All races will be shown on ESPN, ESPN2, ESPN Classic, or ESPN on ABC. Broadcast rights for the 2007 season adhere to a contract extension signed May 27, 2004, which extended broadcast rights to the IndyCar Series on ABC/ESPN through the 2009 season. 2007 will mark ABC's twelfth year broadcasting events of the IndyCar Series, and 43rd year at the Indianapolis 500.
The announcing crew for the 2007 IndyCar Series season will be Marty Reid (play-by-play announcer), Scott Goodyear (Color commentator), along with three pit reporters: Jack Arute, Vince Welch and Brienne Pedigo. Rusty Wallace (analyst) and Jamie Little (pits) will join the crew for the broadcast of the Indy 500.
The television ratings for the March 24 season-opening race at Homestead earned a 0.7 rating, the highest-rated IndyCar Series race ever on ESPN2. It was the fourth-highest IndyCar Series cable rating since 2000 and the highest cable rating since June 2005.

IndyCar Series testing 
Mid-Ohio (September 19, 2006) – Private testing featured Ed Carpenter, Tomas Scheckter, and Jeff Simmons.
 Daytona (September 26–27, 2006) – A highly anticipated compatibility test took place at Daytona International Speedway, utilizing a 10-turn,  combined road course layout. Drivers participating included Vítor Meira, Sam Hornish Jr., Scott Dixon, Dan Wheldon and Tony Kanaan. No major incidents were reported.
Indianapolis (October 2–3, 2006) – A two-day Firestone tire test took place at the Indianapolis Motor Speedway. Four drivers took part in the test, focusing on new 3.5 liter Honda engines utilizing a 100% ethanol fuel mixture. Tony Kanaan, Jeff Simmons, Dan Wheldon, Hélio Castroneves participated. Jeff Simmons crashed exiting turn two on the backstretch. He was uninjured.
Iowa (October 9–10, 2006) – The first IndyCar Series test featured drivers Vítor Meira, and Scott Sharp.
Daytona (January 31 – February 1, 2007) – Seventeen cars tested nearly 1,700 laps around the combined road course. Hélio Castroneves completed the fastest lap at 1:12.3538.
Homestead (February 21–22, 2007) – A full open test was held under the lights. Nineteen car and driver combinations participated. Wheldon, however, later crashed his car. The Indy Pro Series also tested at the track during daylight hours.
Mid-Ohio (June 13, 2007) – A one-day open test featured eighteen car and driver combinations. Dario Franchitti drove the fastest lap (1:07.6667) on the  circuit.
Iowa (June 22, 2007) – Half-day open test.
Detroit (July 24, 2007) – Helio Castroneves conducted a brief compatibility test on roads that comprise the circuit.

Race summaries

Round 1 of 17: XM Satellite Radio Indy 300

Saturday March 24, 2007 –  8:00 p.m. EDT
Homestead-Miami Speedway – Homestead, Florida (1.485 mile oval)
Distance: 200 laps / 297 miles
Race weather: 73 °F, mostly cloudy, isolated showers, windy
Television: ESPN2 – race advertised as the Ethanol 300 Presented by XM Satellite Radio.
Announcers: Marty Reid, Scott Goodyear, Jack Arute, Vince Welch, Brienne Pedigo
Ratings: 0.39 (pre-race), 0.7 (race)
Attendance: 30,000+ (estimated)
Pole position winner: Dan Wheldon- 24.9438 seconds, 214.322 mph (344.918 km/h)
Race Summary: The start of the race was delayed about 30 minutes due to a short shower and was interrupted by a brief mist on lap 67. Even with the weather conditions the race was able to take place and complete all 200 laps. The race was dominated by driver Dan Wheldon who led 179 laps and won despite a mistake in the pits, which led to a pit stop over 22 seconds. Wheldon restarted 9th after the miscue, but retook the lead within 11 laps, and never looked back. Wheldon won for the third year in a row at Homestead and allowed only four other cars to finish on the lead lap. This marked the first race by a major racing series to use renewable fuel, as a 100% ethanol blend was used by all cars.

Round 2 of 17: Honda Grand Prix of St. Petersburg

Sunday April 1, 2007 – 2:30 p.m. EDT
Streets of St. Petersburg – St. Petersburg, Florida (1.8-mile street/airport course)
Distance: 100 laps / 180 miles
Race weather: 79 °F, sunny
Television: ESPN – race advertised as Honda Indycar Grand Prix presented by XM Satellite Radio.
Announcers: Marty Reid, Scott Goodyear, Jack Arute, Vince Welch, Brienne Pedigo
Ratings: 0.6 national, 0.4 coverage area  
Attendance: 100,000+ (estimated weekend attendance)
Pole position winner: Hélio Castroneves- 1:01.6839, 105.052 mph (169.065 km/h)
Race Summary: Pole winner Hélio Castroneves led 95 of the 100 laps, holding off Scott Dixon for the win by 0.6007 seconds, the closest finish on a road circuit in IRL history. On the first lap, five cars were involved in a spin, including Tony Kanaan. In practice, Kanaan had crashed his qualified car, but the team made repairs so he could start in the 6th position rather than using a backup. The spin dropped him to the rear of the field. After a series of pit stops under yellow, Dan Wheldon took the lead. On a lap 35 restart, Castroneves bumped Wheldon from behind, and slipped by to take the lead for good. In the best run by a Foyt team in a few season, Darren Manning ran as high as third until a late spin dropped him to 13th. After the first lap spin, Tony Kanaan recovered to finish third.

Round 3 of 17: Indy Japan 300

Saturday April 21 – 1:00 p.m. JST / 12:00 a.m. EDT
Twin Ring Motegi – Motegi, Japan (1.52 mile oval)
Distance: 200 laps / 304 miles
Race weather: 70 °F, cloudy
Television: ESPN (same-day tape delay at 3:00 p.m. EDT) – race advertised as Firestone Indycar 300
Announcers: Marty Reid, Scott Goodyear, Jack Arute
Broadcast originally scheduled for 12 noon EDT, rescheduled for 3:00 p.m. due to NBA playoffs coverage.
Broadcast delayed 6 minutes due to Nets/Raptors game running long.
Ratings: 0.4 
Attendance:
Pole Position winner: Hélio Castroneves 26.6416 seconds, 205.393 mph (330.548 km/h)
Race Summary: For the second time in two oval races this season, Dan Wheldon dominated much of the race. However, unlike at Homestead, he would not be victorious, and even lost use of his two-way radio. With about 15 laps to go, the final sequence of pit stops for fuel began, and threatened to shuffle the field. Tony Kanaan's AGR team used a late-pit strategy, which saw him take on less fuel and a shorter stop. With four laps to go, Kanaan took the lead and held off Wheldon to claim his first victory of the season. With Kanaan's win, the first three races of the season have produced three different winners representing three different teams. During practice, both Kosuke Matsuura and Danica Patrick turned in some of their best on-track performances thus far this season. Neither were factors during the race however, and Matsuura, in fact, crashed out on the first lap in front of his home country.

Round 4 of 17: Kansas Lottery Indy 300

Sunday April 29 – 3:30 p.m. CDT / 4:30 p.m. EDT
Kansas Speedway – Kansas City, Kansas (1.52 mile oval)
Distance: 200 laps / 304 miles
Race weather: 85 °F (29 °C), Sunny
Television: ESPN2 – race advertised as Kansas IndyCar 300
Announcers: Marty Reid, Scott Goodyear, Jack Arute, Vince Welch, Brienne Pedigo
Ratings: 0.3 
Attendance: 70,000 (media estimate) 
AAMCO Pole Award: Tony Kanaan 25.5476 sec, 214.188 mph (344.702 km/h)
Race Summary: Tony Kanaan and Dan Wheldon dueled until the first pit stop when Kanaan and his teammate Danica Patrick made contact during the stop and Kanaan lost several laps due to repairs. The only other car that could run with Wheldon for the remainder of the race was teammate Scott Dixon until Dixon was brought in for a penalty for entering the pits improperly. Wheldon dominated the remainder of the race which finished under caution after a solo crash by Scott Sharp with 2 laps to go. This race made history as it was the first major open-wheel race to feature three female drivers: Patrick, Sarah Fisher, and rookie Milka Duno. It also registered the highest average speed of any race at Kansas Speedway.

Round 5 of 17: 91st Indianapolis 500

Sunday May 27 – 1:00 p.m. EDT
Indianapolis Motor Speedway – Speedway, Indiana (2.50 mile oval)
Distance: 200 laps / 500 miles, although reduced to 166 laps / 415 miles, due to rain.
Race weather: Overcast, with rain throughout the day, high 76 F.
Television: ABC – race advertised as Indianapolis 500 broadcast presented by GoDaddy.com
Announcers: Marty Reid, Scott Goodyear, Rusty Wallace, Jack Arute, Vince Welch, Brienne Pedigo, Jamie Little
Ratings: 4.3/12
Attendance: 251,000 (estimated based on track capacity)
AAMCO Pole Award: Hélio Castroneves – 2:42.3336, 225.817 mph (363.417 km/h)
Race Summary:  Rain fell overnight, and in the morning, but the race started on-time as scheduled. In the early segments of the race, the competition was intense as Hélio Castroneves, Tony Kanaan, Marco Andretti, and Scott Dixon all took their turn at the lead. After a caution period, with rain only a few miles away, a restart  on lap 107 could have decided the winner. As the green came out, Tony Kanaan got the jump on Marco Andretti, and took the lead in turn 1. Moments later, Phil Giebler crashed, bringing the yellow out once again. Before safety crews could clear the track, heavy rain fell, and the race was red flagged after lap 113. After nearly three hours, the race resumed, with Kanaan leading. On the 156th lap, the field went back to green after Marty Roth's crash, however, in turn four, Tony Kanaan came up on the back of Jacques Lazier, sending Lazier into the wall, and sending Kanaan's car into a spin. He blew a tire and coasted into the pits. Moments later, the field assembled for what was expected to be the final restart before the rains came. Franchitti, working lap 163, held the lead into the backstretch. Behind him, Marco Andretti tangled with Dan Wheldon, and Andretti's car flipped down the backstretch. Before the track could be cleared, a heavy rainstorm fell on the track, and the race was called after 166 laps with Dario Franchitti declared the winner.

Round 6 of 17: ABC Supply Company A. J. Foyt 225

Sunday June 3 –  3:00 p.m. CDT / 4:00 p.m. EDT
Milwaukee Mile – West Allis, Wisconsin (1-mile oval)
Distance: 225 laps / 225 miles
Race weather: , mostly cloudy
Television: ABC
Announcers: Marty Reid, Scott Goodyear, Jack Arute, Vince Welch, Brienne Pedigo
Ratings: 1.0 (final), 1.2 (overnight)
Attendance:  31,838
AAMCO Pole Award: Hélio Castroneves – 21.3596 sec., 171.071 mph (275.312 km/h)
Race Summary: Polesitter Hélio Castroneves appeared to have the race in hand until his rear wing support snapped coming out of turn 4 on lap 201. His car spun across the front stretch and into the inside retaining wall. Shortly after the restart Penske Racing teammate Sam Hornish Jr.'s rear wing bent in a similar place, although mildly enough to allow him to finish the race, but he was forced to relinquish second place. These two somewhat bizarre part failures allowed AGR teammates Tony Kanaan and Dario Franchitti to cruise to a 1–2 finish. On lap 89, Danica Patrick and Dan Wheldon touched wheels, sending Patrick spinning. Both recovered to finish in the top ten, however, the incident led to a post-race confrontation where Patrick grabbed and pushed Wheldon, starting a feud between the two. Neither driver received any penalty.

Round 7 of 17: Bombardier Learjet 550

Saturday June 9 –  8:30 p.m. CDT / 9:30 p.m. EDT
Texas Motor Speedway – Fort Worth, Texas (1.5-mile oval)
Distance: 228 laps / 342 miles (550 Kilometers)
Race weather:  Hazy
Television: ESPN2 (tape delayed 30 minutes)
Announcers: Marty Reid, Scott Goodyear, Jack Arute, Vince Welch, Brienne Pedigo
Ratings: 0.7/2 
Attendance:  86,000
AAMCO Pole Award: Scott Sharp 24.3334 sec 215.260 mph (346.427 km/h)
Race Summary: Sam Hornish Jr. had built up a sizeable lead by lap 196 when A. J. Foyt IV lost his right rear wheel, causing Sarah Fisher to check up and several contenders including Hélio Castroneves, Dan Wheldon, and Scott Dixon to be collected in the resulting melee. After the restart, Andretti Green teammates Tony Kanaan and Danica Patrick attempted to mount an attack on Hornish but he was able to hold them off to collect his first win of the season. Danica Patrick's resulting 3rd place was the best finish of her career.

Round 8 of 17: Iowa Corn Indy 250 presented by Ethanol

Sunday June 24 – 1:00 p.m. EDT
Iowa Speedway – Newton, Iowa (0.894 mile oval)
Distance: 250 laps / 223.5 miles
Race weather: Cloudy, high humidity, 71 degrees
Television: ABC – race advertised as Ethanol IndyCar 250
Announcers: Marty Reid, Scott Goodyear, Jack Arute, Vince Welch, Brienne Pedigo
Ratings: 1.2/3 (overnight rating); 1.1/3 final
Attendance:  over 35,000 (sold out)
AAMCO Pole Award: #9 Scott Dixon 17.6486 sec, 182.360 mph (293.480 km/h)
Race Summary: The first IndyCar Series race at the Iowa Speedway was one of attrition with several experienced drivers involved in incidents. First, Dan Wheldon spun, collecting Tomas Scheckter, although Wheldon was later able to return to the track over 100 laps down. Next, Tony Kanaan spun, collecting Jeff Simmons. The largest incident of the day come on a restart with Ed Carpenter, Danica Patrick, A. J. Foyt IV and Dario Franchitti running four-wide down the front straight. Carpenter, Foyt, and Patrick made contact entering turn one and Kosuke Matsuura spun into the wall trying to miss them. The final 100 laps were more orderly with fewer cars on the track and Franchitti was able to hold off teammate Marco Andretti for his second victory of the season.

Round 9 of 17: SunTrust Indy Challenge presented by XM Satellite Radio

Saturday June 30 – 7:30 p.m. EDT
Richmond International Raceway – Richmond, Virginia (0.75 mile oval)
Distance: 250 laps / 187.5 miles
Race weather: , Mostly Cloudy
Television: ESPN – race advertised as Richmond IndyCar 250 presented by XM Satellite Radio
Announcers: Marty Reid, Scott Goodyear, Jack Arute, Vince Welch, Brienne Pedigo
Ratings: 0.6 
Attendance:  45,000
AAMCO Pole Award: Dario Franchitti (rained out, field set by owner points)
Race Summary: Qualifying was rained out and the field was set by entrant points. As a result, points leader Dario Franchitti started the race from the pole. Franchitti dominated the race, leading all but 9 laps on his way to his third win of the season, and eighth consecutive top-5 finish. He opened up a 65-point lead in the championship ahead of Scott Dixon. The race was under yellow as soon as it went green when Sam Hornish Jr. spun his Penske car on the inside of Turn 4. When the green flag flew on lap 4, Franchitti opened up a lead, before another caution period on lap 61 for debris. Lap 64 saw the leaders make pit stops, and it was Tony Kanaan who made the pit exit first. He led until lap 72, when Franchitti took advantage of a sluggish restart from his AGR teammate to retake the lead. He led the next 88 laps until a single car crash involving Jeff Simmons. Hélio Castroneves led for a solitary lap, before serving a drive-through penalty for illegal blending under the pace car. The pace car then picked up what driver Johnny Rutherford believed was a puncture while leading the field, and had to switch to one of the others. Ultimately an excess amount of rubber debris had built up on the car's tires. Franchitti led the rest of the way, despite another caution for contact between Hornish and Kosuke Matsuura. Franchitti held on to win by 0.4194 seconds from the Ganassi pair of Dixon and Dan Wheldon, with Kanaan coming home 4th. Buddy Rice continued on his recent success, rounding out the top five despite starting on the outside of the sixth row.

Round 10 of 17: Camping World Watkins Glen Grand Prix

Sunday July 8 – 3:30 p.m. EDT
Watkins Glen International – Watkins Glen, New York (3.37 mile permanent road course)
Distance: 60 laps / 202.5 miles
Race weather: 
Television: ABC
Announcers: Marty Reid, Scott Goodyear, Jack Arute, Vince Welch, Brienne Pedigo
Ratings: 1.0 
Attendance:  
AAMCO Pole Award: Hélio Castroneves 1:29.1919, 136.021 mph (218.905 km/h)
Race Summary: Castroneves led the first 19 laps, and on lap 20, under growing pressure from Scott Dixon, crashed in turn 11, bringing out the first yellow of the race. The green came out on lap 23, with Dixon leading. Lap 25 saw the second caution of the race, a spin by A. J. Foyt IV at Turn 8. As Dixon pitted, Vítor Meira grabbed the lead, which he would hold until lap 33. Meira's pit strategy was midjudged, and ran out of fuel, causing the 3rd full course caution. Dan Wheldon would lead lap 33, before pitting, allowing Marco Andretti to take the lead on lap 34. Andretti led until his final pitstop on lap 44, which would give Dixon the lead until the finish. Sam Hornish Jr. ended up 2nd, with the Andretti Green trio of Dario Franchitti, Andretti and Tony Kanaan rounding out the top 5. Dixon also cut into Franchitti's massive points lead, reducing it from 65 to 47, after Dixon accumulated the maximum 53 points for the win, and most laps led (23) compared to the 35 that Franchitti earned for 3rd position. After the race, there was a bizarre incident in the pit lane. On the track, Hornish Jr. and Kanaan clashed on the track (sidepod to wheel), which caused damage to each racecar. Then, Kanaan faked a turn on the reigning champion, while coming into the pitlane on the slow-down lap. This made Hornish Jr. come towards Kanaan to discuss events on the track. Sam Hornish, the father of the Penske driver, then pushed Kanaan, making his frustration known. He was then tackled to the ground by someone standing nearby. Marco Andretti stepped in and stopped his father Michael from getting involved, and Jaime Camara, the IPS driver for AGR, was also involved in breaking up the melée. In total, some 15 to 20 people were involved in the incident.

Round 11 of 17: Firestone Indy 200

Sunday July 15 – 1:00 p.m. EDT, postponed from Saturday July 14 – 7:30 p.m. EDT due to rain
Nashville Superspeedway – Lebanon, Tennessee (1.33 mile concrete oval)
Distance: 200 laps / 266 miles
Race weather: , Scattered clouds and showers
Television: ESPN2 (originally scheduled for ESPN)
Announcers: Marty Reid, Scott Goodyear, Jack Arute, Vince Welch, Brienne Pedigo
Ratings: 0.4 
Attendance:  25,000 
AAMCO Pole Award: Scott Dixon 22.8947 sec 204.414 mph (328.972 km/h)
Race Summary:

Round 12 of 17: The Honda 200 at Mid-Ohio presented by Westfield Insurance

Sunday July 22 – 1:30 p.m. EDT
Mid-Ohio Sports Car Course – Lexington, Ohio (2.25 mile permanent road course)
Distance: 85 laps / 192 miles
Race weather: , Mostly Sunny
Television: ABC (first hour broadcast on ESPN due to 2007 British Open running long)
Announcers: Marty Reid, Scott Goodyear, Jack Arute, Vince Welch, Brienne Pedigo
Ratings: 1.7/5 (final), 1.9/5 (overnight)
Attendance: 60,000
AAMCO Pole Award: #3 Hélio Castroneves 1 min 06.8375 sec 121.620 mph (195.728 km/h)
Race Summary: Castroneves' sixth pole of the season tied Billy Boat's record for most poles in a season, set in 1998. On the first lap, Andretti Green teammates Danica Patrick, Tony Kanaan, and Marco Andretti tangled, resulting in Andretti's car flipping over Kanaan's rear tire and landing upside-down. Andretti was uninjured. On the final fuel stop, Scott Dixon's Chip Ganassi Racing crew was able to short-fill and get him out ahead of rivals Castroneves and Dario Franchitti. This was Dixon's third win in a row, tying Kenny Bräck (1998) and Dan Wheldon (2005) for the longest win streak in league history.

Round 13 of 17: Firestone Indy 400

Sunday August 5–12:00 p.m. EDT
Michigan International Speedway – Brooklyn, Michigan (2-mile oval)
Distance: 200 laps / 400 miles
Race weather:  Rainy/Foggy
Television: ESPN Classic (rain delay coverage aired on ESPN2)
Announcers: Marty Reid, Scott Goodyear, Jack Arute, Vince Welch, Brienne Pedigo
Ratings: 0.28 (ESPN 2 rain delay coverage), no ratings available for ESPN Classic
Attendance: 35,000
AAMCO Pole Award: Dario Franchitti 32.981 sec 218.308 mph (351.333 km/h)
Race Summary: The race start was delayed  hours due to persistent rainy conditions. As a result, the US telecast was moved to ESPN Classic. Once the race began, it became a war of attrition marked by two significant incidents. The first came when Hélio Castroneves and Vítor Meira hooked wheels just past the start-finish line, slamming both cars hard into the outside wall. Castroneves was visibly upset with Meira after the incident and walked all the way to the infield care center, later complaining of knee pain and being diagnosed with only a bruised knee. On Lap 139, polesitter Dario Franchitti and leader Dan Wheldon hooked wheels on the back-stretch, sending Franchitti sideways and later sailing upside down, landing on the cars of Scott Dixon and A. J. Foyt IV. Franchitti's car was the same one he had driven to victory in the Indy 500. The incident collected seven cars and all drivers, including Franchitti, were uninjured. A lengthy caution followed with just seven cars remaining running and on the lead-lap. Andretti Green Racing was set to capture a 1–2–3 finish until Danica Patrick suffered a punctured right-rear tire with 13 laps to go, forcing her to pit, leaving AGR driver Tony Kanaan to hold off teammate Marco Andretti for his third win of the season. The carnage resulted in career-best finishes for Kosuke Matsuura (4th), Ryan Hunter-Reay (6th), and Foyt (8th) despite his car not running at the finish. There was no race at Michigan on the 2008 calendar, so this may be the last major open wheel race held at the speedway in the foreseeable future.

Round 14 of 17: Meijer Indy 300 presented by Coca-Cola and Edy's

Saturday August 11 – 6:30 p.m. EDT
Kentucky Speedway – Sparta, Kentucky (1.5-mile oval)
Distance: 200 laps / 300 miles
Race weather:  Sunny
Television: ABC
Announcers: Marty Reid, Scott Goodyear, Jack Arute, Vince Welch, Brienne Pedigo
Ratings: 0.6
Attendance:  56,482
AAMCO Pole Award: Tony Kanaan 24.4307 sec 218.086 mph (350.975 km/h)
Race Summary: Starting from the pole for the first time since Kansas in April, the AGR car of Tony Kanaan led the opening 38 laps, right up to the first round of pitstops, under caution, after a crash on lap 36 involving Team Penske's Sam Hornish Jr. & Ganassi's Dan Wheldon. Dario Franchitti would leapfrog his AGR teammate on the pitstops, taking the lead on lap 39 for the restart on lap 44. Franchitti would lead until the second round of pitstops, under green flag conditions. Franchitti was the first to pit, on lap 91. This allowed Kanaan and Scott Dixon into the lead and second positions respectively. Both drivers would pit the following lap for their second pitstops. A. J. Foyt IV took the lead, and he would two laps, before pitting on lap 94. On the pitstops, Kanaan and Dixon had passed Franchitti, allowing them to be first and second, when everyone had made their pitstops. The race continued under green, until lap 126, when a caution was flown for debris in turn 3. Yellow-flag pitstops would occur, and a fast pitstop from the #9 crew allowed them, to lead for the restart on lap 132. Kanaan would pass Dixon the very next lap, and would hold the lead until the final round of pitstops. As Kanaan, Dixon and most of the other frontrunners pitted on lap 179, Foyt returned to the lead. As Foyt pitted on lap 181, the final yellow was flown, after an incident which began on pitlane. The AGR cars of Franchitti and Danica Patrick collided on pit entry, causing damage to Franchitti's right front wing endplate. He would need the nosecone replaced, but would not lose a lap. Meanwhile, Patrick was exiting pit road, and got on the power too early, causing her to spin. She would be bump-started by the Delphi safety crew. Next time by, still under caution, a tyre blew on the #7 car in turn 2, making her spin again, and narrowly avoided the safety crew. Foyt would lead the field to the restart on lap 190, but Kanaan was not to be denied, taking the lead for good on lap 191. Leading 131 of the 200 laps, the Brazilian won his 4th race of this season, and moved back into the championship running. Dixon finished 2nd, to further close on Franchitti's championship lead. The Scotsman, suffered his second backflip in a row, after hitting the #55 car of Kosuke Matsuura. He put all the blame on himself, saying that he thought the race was not over. He was the last of the cars on the lead lap, finishing in 8th, giving up 16 of his 24-point championship lead. Foyt finished a career-high 3rd, just holding off the final AGR car of Marco Andretti and his Vision Racing teammate Tomas Scheckter.

Round 15 of 17: Motorola Indy 300

Sunday August 26 – 3:30 p.m. EDT
Infineon Raceway – Sonoma, California (2.3-mile road course)
Distance: 80 laps / 184 miles
Race weather: , Sunny
Television: ESPN
Announcers: Marty Reid, Scott Goodyear, Jack Arute, Vince Welch, Brienne Pedigo
Ratings: 0.6
Attendance: 40,000 
AAMCO Pole Award: Dario Franchitti 1:16.7017, 107.961 mph (172.738 km/h)
Race Summary: Points leader Dario Franchitti took the lead at the start, and held it for 58 of the first 63 laps. On the 69th lap, Franchitti's AGR teammate Marco Andretti was exiting the pits, and entered the track directly in front of Franchitti. In turn two, the two cars made contact, and Andretti was spun out into the barrier. Franchitti suffered a badly damaged front wing, but stayed out on the track. The race went back to green with eight laps to go, with Scott Dixon and Hélio Castroneves in close pursuit. Both Dixon and Castroneves were able to pass Franchitti's ill-handling machine, and went on to finish 1st–2nd. Tony Kanaan, however, stayed behind Franchitti and refused to pass him, and helped his teammate by preventing anyone from passing either, which protected Franchitti's third-place finish. With the victory, Scott Dixon took over the championship points lead. Franchitti's contact with Marco Andretti, son of team co-owner Michael Andretti, sparked an in-house feud as the elder Andretti considered Franchitti's actions "impatient."

Round 16 of 17: Detroit Indy Grand Prix presented by Firestone

Sunday September 2–3:30 p.m. EDT
The Raceway on Belle Isle – Detroit, Michigan (2.07 mile temporary street course)
Distance: 90 laps / 186.3 miles (shortened to 89 laps  due to time limit)
Race weather: , sunny
Television: ABC
Announcers: Marty Reid, Scott Goodyear, Jack Arute, Vince Welch, Brienne Pedigo
Ratings: 1.0 
Attendance: 30,000 (est. raceday) 100,000 (weekend attendance) 
AAMCO Pole Award: Hélio Castroneves 1:12.0688, 103.401 mph (166.408 km/h)
Race Summary: After a six-year absence, open wheel racing returned to the Belle Isle circuit. Minor track modifications intended to increase passing opportunities, however, saw lead changes only during pit stops, and several crashes. On the 31st lap, Sam Hornish Jr. tangled with lap car Sarah Fisher, which took both cars out, along with Vítor Meira. Darren Manning hit the back of Danica Patrick's car, causing her to spin, but both continued. Later in the race, Hélio Castroneves crashed out with Tomas Scheckter as the two were battling for position. Danica Patrick then climbed to the lead for nine laps by pitting out of sequence. After the final series of pit stops, a four-car battle at the front ensued, and held significant season championship implications. With time running out, Tony Kanaan was leading, and second place Buddy Rice ran out of fuel. Third place Scott Dixon, the championship points leader going into the race, took evasive action to get by Rice, which crashed out both cars. The pileup collected points contender Dario Franchitti as well. Danica Patrick slipped by the crash and took a career-best second place, while Kanaan went on to win. Franchitti managed to continue and limped to a sixth-place finish. Tempers flared as AGR co-owner Michael Andretti was quick to accuse Dixon of intentionally taking out Franchitti by letting off the brakes and rolling into the path of Franchitti. The incident tightened the championship chase, and moved Franchitti into the points lead by only three points with one race remaining.

Round 17 of 17: Peak Antifreeze Indy 300 presented by Mr. Clean

Sunday September 9 – 3:30 p.m. EDT / 2:30 p.m. CDT
Chicagoland Speedway – Joliet, Illinois (1.52 mile oval)
Distance: 200 laps / 304 miles
Race weather: , sunny
Television: ABC
Announcers: Marty Reid, Scott Goodyear, Jack Arute, Vince Welch, Brienne Pedigo
Ratings: 0.9 
Attendance:  
AAMCO Pole Award: Dario Franchitti – 25.4931 seconds, 
Race Summary: The final race of the season saw Dario Franchitti enter with a three-point lead over Scott Dixon in the championship chase. Tony Kanaan held third, the only other driver mathematically eligible for the title. Penske teammates Sam Hornish Jr. and Hélio Castroneves dominated most of the race, leading a combined 146 laps. Tony Kanaan saw his championship hopes go away early in the race when a flat tire forced an unscheduled pit stop. He would eventually finish 6th in the race. Single-car crashes by Marco Andretti and later Vítor Meira were the only significant on track incidents of the day. Meira's crash on lap 136 caused damage to the SAFER barrier, and a long 15-lap caution ensued as track workers repaired the barrier. It set up a dramatic fuel strategy, as both Franchitti and Dixon decided to pit to top off their tanks, and thus gamble on stretching their fuel to the end of the race. With the laps winding down, most of the leaders ducked into the pits for a quick fuel stops. That left Dixon leading, Franchitti second, and Danica Patrick third. Patrick headed for the pits on lap 195, but spun at the entrance, bringing out the caution. Both Dixon and Franchitti attempted to conserve fuel under the yellow, and prepared for a two-lap sprint to decide the race winner, and ultimately the season championship. The green came out with two laps to go, and the two battled side by side. On the final lap, entering turn three, Dixon ran out of fuel. Franchitti slipped by to take the lead, win the race, and clinch the 2007 IndyCar Series Championship title. With Franchitti reportedly heading to NASCAR, along with possibly Sam Hornish Jr., it marked what could be the final IndyCar Series race for the 2006 and 2007 Indianapolis 500 and IndyCar Series champions respectively.

Season summary

Race results

Final driver standings 

 Ties in points broken by number of wins, followed by number of 2nds, 3rds, etc., and then by number of pole positions, followed by number of times qualified 2nd, etc.

See also
 2007 Indianapolis 500
 2007 Indy Pro Series season
 2007 Champ Car season
 2007 Champ Car Atlantic season

References

External links
IndyCar.com – official site
Indianapolis 500 – official site
Indianapolis Star

IndyCar Series seasons
 
IndyCar Series